Munishri Pramansagarji Maharaj is a Digambar monk of Terapanth sub-sect. He is an able disciple of Acharya Shri Vidyasagar Ji Maharaj. He has set free the religion from traditional abstruseness and made it practicable in life. Through his sermons and initiatives, the process of a qualitative change in society has begun. He led a campaign to save the Jain tradition of Santhara also known as Sallekhana in the year 2015, in which millions of Jain community members took out massive silent rallies in several cities and towns all over the world against the Rajasthan High Court decision. Gunayatan is one of his important religious initiatives which is going to become a centre for self-development in the true sense. His pravachans and Shanka Samadhan programme are aired on Jinvani Channel and Paras TV Channel.

Life 
Muni Pramansagar was born on 27 June 1967 in Hazaribagh, Jharkhand as Naveen Kumar Jain in the house of Shree Surendra Kumar Jain and Smt. Sohni Devi Jain  He  got Vairagya on 4 March 1984 and was initiated as a Digambara monk by Acharya Vidyasagar ji on 31 March 1988 in Sonagiri.

On the issue of Sallekhana controversy, he said:"Santhara is not a suicide. Jainism considers suicide a sin. Followers of every religion do penance through different means and Jainism also does so for self-purification"

Muni Pramansagar is a Digambar monk who took initiative in Dharmbachao Andolan to oppose the  Rajasthan High Court's decision to ban Sallekhana, the decision of Rajasthan High Court
was subsequently suspended by Supreme Court of India. He also organized programme for chanting Jain hymn Namokar Mantra 1 crore times. Gunayatan is one of his other religious initiatives. His pravachans and Shanka Samadhan programme are aired on Jinvani & Paras TV channel.

As per religious protocol for Jain monks, Muni Pramansagar Ji does not stay at one place for long except for 4 months in rainy season (Chaturmas). His 2016 Chaturmas was in Ajmer, Rajasthan. He visited Kuchaman, Rajasthan in June 2016.

Works 
Muni Pramansagar is a known scholar of Hindi, Sanskrit, Prakrit and English languages. He has authored several books on Jainism and Jain philosophy as listed:-
Jain Dharm Aur Darshan, Jain Tattv Vidya, Divya Jeevan Ka Dwar, Jyotirmay Jeevan, Jeevan Utkarsh Ka Aadhaar, Lakshya Jeevan Ka, Antas Ki Aankhen, Jeevan Ki Sanjeevani, Jain Siddhant Shikshan, Path Pade Nav Jeevan Ka, Andaaj Jeevan Jeene Ka, Ghar Ko Kaise Swarg Banayen, Sukhi Jeevan Ki Raah,Dharm Saadhiye Jeevan Mein,Marm Jeevan Ka.

Muni Pramansgar has evolved ‘Bhawana Yaga’ by redefining the ancient Indian dictum of  'Yad bhavyaate tad bhavati' (thought becomes things) in the modern form to make the body healthy, the mind cool and the soul pure.

References

External links 
 
 
 

1967 births
Living people
Indian Jain monks
20th-century Indian Jains
20th-century Jain monks
20th-century Indian monks
21st-century Indian Jains
21st-century Jain monks
21st-century Indian monks
Digambara monks